Sebastiania laureola is a species of flowering plant in the family Euphorbiaceae. It was originally described as Stillingia laureola Baill. in 1865. It is native to Rio de Janeiro, Brazil.

References

Plants described in 1865
Flora of Brazil
laureola
Taxa named by Johannes Müller Argoviensis
Taxa named by Henri Ernest Baillon